John Arthur Joule is a British academic and chemist. Joule took his BSc, MSc, and PhD degrees at the University of Manchester, obtaining his PhD (with George Smith) in 1961. He then undertook post-doctoral work at with Professor Richard K. Hill at Princeton University  and Professor Carl Djerassi at Stanford University. In 1963 he joined the academic staff of the Chemistry Department at the University of Manchester, where he is currently an Emeritus Professor. In 1996 he received an RSC Medal for Heterocyclic Chemistry.

He co-wrote the textbook Heterocyclic Chemistry, initially with George Smith, but then with other authors in later editions.

External links 
 John Joule University Homepage

References 

Year of birth missing (living people)
Living people
Princeton University alumni
Alumni of the Victoria University of Manchester
Academics of the University of Manchester
British chemists